Leabrooks is a small urban locality in Derbyshire that merges with the village of Somercotes and the locality of Greenhill Lane. It is named after a stream, the Lee Brook, which formerly ran through it after rising on an area known as The Lees (off Sleetmoor Lane, originally known as Lee Moor Lane). It has a number of shops and businesses, a pub, a park and a cemetery.

Sofa Brands International, best known for the Parker Knoll range, is a principal employer in the area having acquired the Leabrooks Upholstery company.

References

External links

Villages in Derbyshire
Geography of Amber Valley